This is a list of rural localities in Saratov Oblast. Saratov Oblast (Saratovskaya oblast) is a federal subject of Russia (an oblast), located in the Volga Federal District. Its administrative center is the city of Saratov. As of the 2010 Census, its population was 2,521,892.

Locations 
 Alexandrov Gay
 Avgustovka
 Baltay
 Ivanteyevka
 Mikhaylovsky
 Perelyub
 Piterka
 Slastukha
 Sosnovka
 Svetly
 Voskresenskoye
 Yablonovka

See also 
 
 Lists of rural localities in Russia

References 

Saratov Oblast